La Fábrica ("The Factory") is the name given to Real Madrid's farm system and academy. Considered one of the best player development centres in the world, La Fábrica has produced a number of players that have contributed to Real Madrid's sustained sporting success since its inception.

La Fábrica is housed in Ciudad Real Madrid, Real Madrid's training facility located in Valdebebas.

History

In 1942, AD Plus Ultra, a local Madrid club then in the Spanish Third Division, agreed to become Real Madrid's feeder club in return for financial support. In 1972, AD Plus Ultra became Real's official reserve team, known today as Real Madrid Castilla. RM Castilla is the most successful reserve side in the history of Spanish football, having amassed more points in the Spanish Second Division than any other reserve side. In 1980, RM Castilla even reached the final of the Copa del Rey, Spain's premier domestic cup competition, where they lost the title to Real Madrid's first team squad.

Similarly, in the 1950s, Real Madrid Aficionados (English: Real Madrid Amateurs) was formed as an amateur competitive team affiliated with Real Madrid. That club eventually became Real Madrid C, and served as Real's second reserve team – after RM Castilla – until the team was disbanded in 2015.

The youth academy system itself was established and developed in the 1950s by former Real Madrid Aficionados player Miguel Malbo under the tutelage of the then-Real Madrid president, Santiago Bernabéu. Malbo went on to serve as Director of La Fábrica for over 50 years. Isidoro San José, former Real Madrid player, La Fábrica alumnus and deputy director at La Fábrica, said of Malbo's legacy at Real Madrid, "In his day, he was one of the people that contributed most to Real Madrid, and to Madrid's cantera."

Since its beginnings in the 1950s, countless players have progressed through the ranks of La Fábrica's youth academy, and some of these graduates have contributed to Real Madrid's formidable sporting success both domestically and internationally. Some periods of success are particularly noteworthy. Between 1955 and 1965, Real Madrid won eight La Liga titles, one Copa del Rey and six UEFA Champions Leagues. A number of La Fábrica graduates contributed to Real's success in these years, including Pedro Casado, Enrique Mateos, Gregorio Benito, Juan Santisteban, Manuel Velázquez, Ramón Grosso, Fernando Serena and Ramón Marsal.

Moreover, in the 1980s Real Madrid won five consecutive La Liga titles, two consecutive UEFA Europa Leagues (then known as the UEFA Cup), and reached three consecutive Champions League (then known as the European Cup) semi-finals with a squad composed mostly of players formed at La Fábrica, also known as La Quinta del Buitre. This batch of "homegrown" Real Madrid players included Emilio Butragueño, Chendo, Manolo Sanchís, Ricardo Gallego, Míchel, Sebastián Losada, Miguel Pardeza and  Rafael Martín Vázquez.

Organization

Real Madrid Castilla is a fully professional team; all other teams at La Fábrica are youth teams including everything from under-19-year-olds to under-8-year-olds. Each youth team competes in a league of its own. Youth players must aspire to progress through the ranks if they wish to eventually debut in Real's first-team squad. La Fábrica has more than 270 youth players spread across all 12 youth teams.

References

External links
Official Website

 
Buildings and structures in Barajas District, Madrid
Real Madrid CF
Football academies in Spain